α-Bisabolene synthase (EC 4.2.3.38, bisabolene synthase) is an enzyme with systematic name (2E,6E)-farnesyl-diphosphate diphosphate-lyase ((E)-α-bisabolene-forming). This enzyme catalyses the following chemical reaction

 (2E,6E)-farnesyl diphosphate  (E)-α-bisabolene + diphosphate

This synthase requires a divalent cation cofactor (Mg2+ or, to a lesser extent, Mn2+) to neutralize the negative charge of the diphosphate leaving group.

References

External links 
 

EC 4.2.3